The Masungi Georeserve is a conservation area in the Philippines situated in the southern Sierra Madre range in Baras, Rizal near Tanay, Rizal, 47 kilometres (28 mi) east of Manila. In 1993, the Masungi Rock and its vicinity was proposed to be declared as a Strict Nature Reserve and Wildlife Sanctuary by the Department of Environment and Natural Resources. It has been a popular destination for hikes and day trips from Manila since it opened in 2015 and started development towards Geopark status.

Description 
The Masungi Georeserve is located at Kilometer 47, Marilaque Highway, Baras, Rizal, Philippines, post code 1970. The Masungi Georeserve is characterized by rugged limestone karst peaks, steep slopes, and surrounding lush montane rainforests. It contains several caves, including the Yungib ni Ruben (Ruben's Cave), which features stalactite and stalagmite formations, as well as a man-made fountain.

A popular attraction in the park is the Sapot ("Cobweb"), a metallic platform with wooden steps which allows visitors to walk on suspended netting above the karst and get a 360-degree view of the Sierra Madre and Laguna de Bay. The park's tallest peak, Tatay, also has a viewing deck at its summit. The limestone formations are connected by hanging bridges, rope courses and eco-trails developed by the Masungi Georeserve Foundation and Blue Star Development. On one of the hanging bridges, a wooden cable car-like shelter called Patak ("water droplet") can be found which serves as a rest stop for visitors. The Duyan, a giant rope hammock spanning a few hundred feet, is one of Masungi's most photographed rope courses.

The park was formerly a component of the Mariquina Watershed Reservation from its creation on July 26, 1904 to Oct. 29, 1973.

Biology and ecology
Masungi is home to 400 species of flora and fauna including birds, insects, cloud rats, monitor lizards, snakes, monkeys, and civets. Cycas riuminiana, a cycad endemic to Luzon, also grows in Masungi.

In 2017, a new subspecies of microsnail, Hypselostoma latispira masungiensis, was discovered on the limestone boulders of Masungi Georeserve. The park is the only known habitat of the newly discovered subspecies.

Trail specifications 
The Masungi Georeserve only allows a limited number of guests to go through the conservation area at their request. An experienced park ranger guides guests throughout the trek, providing in-depth information about the sustainable tourism industry in the Philippines.

References 

Sierra Madre (Philippines)
Geography of Rizal
Tourist attractions in Rizal
Proposed protected areas